Krullsbach  is a river of North Rhine-Westphalia, Germany. It flows into the Lutter northwest of Gütersloh.

See also
List of rivers of North Rhine-Westphalia

Rivers of North Rhine-Westphalia
Rivers of Germany